4-Methyl-α-ethylaminopentiophenone (4-MEAP) is a designer drug of the cathinone class.  It is a higher homolog of 4-methylpentedrone (4-MPD) with an ethyl group in place of the methyl group.  4-MEAP has been found in samples of drugs sold as 4-MPD.

In the United States, 4-MEAP is a Schedule I Controlled Substance.

References 

Designer drugs
Cathinones